Ohangla is a traditional dance among the Luo community. It was used to celebrate weddings and also in funeral ceremony as part of Tero Buru. Ohangla consists of more than 8 drums hit by a stick and a cylindrical shoulder slung drum played normally to the accompaniment of flute, Nyatiti or kinanda. Tony Nyadundo, Osogo Winyo and Onyi Papa Jey are among the best known Ohangla musicians.The original Ohangla has very fast tempo nature and vulgar messages convey in the music. Local elders used to ban ohangla music in the early 1980s. Because the music was meant for adults. "the songs can only be interpreted by very intelligent or mature people, but not children or teenagers" says Juma Oketch, an ohangala band vocalist based in Nairobi.

Ohangla was mainly associated with vigorous gyration of the hips, suggestive dances, obscene lyrics and liberal changaa (illicit brew) drinking among fans and players. Indeed, in the early 1980s, the then chief of West Alego in Alego/Usonga constituency, Siaya District, Peter Osowo, banned the performance of ohangla within the location after one of his wives eloped with a physically challenged ohangla player. "Ere kaka puth nyalo maya dhako?" (How can a crippled man take away my wife?), protested a fuming Osowo at a local chief's baraza (gathering)

And so goes the old Dholuo adage "Ohangla ok budhgo miaha", which means ohangla is never to be used for entertaining a woman or a bride for that matter. But the Luo sages who coined this saying must now be turning in their graves. For today, ohangla is used for common entertainment, including at wedding parties and campaign rallies. In the olden days, ohangla was mainly played at funerals, beer parties and during Yawo rut (a celebration to mark the birth of twins). No Luo worth his salt would attend an in-law's funeral minus ohangla.

Ohangla, a traditional musical outfit originally associated with the Luo, community of western Kenya has been reborn and restored and now cuts across age groups and tribal lines.Present ohangla whose original beats and vocal harmonies have been infused with modern instruments is used for common entertainment, including at wedding parties and campaign rallies. While in the olden days, ohangla was mainly played at funerals, beer parties and during other cultural celebrations.Gone are the days when ohangala music was mainly associated with energetic twist of the hips, provocative dances, obscene lyrics and liberal changaa (illicit brew) drinking among fans and players.

But ohangla has now been reloaded whereas in the olden days the music was mainly enjoyed by middle aged and old men and women from the Luo community. Both the young and the old, Luos and non-Luos have embraced ohangla, with passion. It is not surprising to hear a person from the Kikuyu tribe, humming the lyrics of ohangla, which never misses from the entertainment menu at any major event in Kenya today. Even foreign tourists are not an exception, especially those from Europe frequent ohangla night spots in Nairobi city and can be seen dancing wildly to the beats.Veteran ohangla players like "Dr" Oduor Odhialo and Jack Nyadundo have kept the ohangla flame alive; a number of upcoming artistes are giving them a run for their money.

The Luo traditional instrument Ohangla has revolutionised music scene and trends have moved in the last couple of years.With wonderment, fans gyrate their hips like possessed villagers.Indeed, Ohangla has transcended tribal borders and is largely accepted even by people who hardly understand the messages in the music.

References

Luo people
Kenyan music
African dances